Mazarin may refer to:

Cardinal Mazarin, 17th-century minister to the French king
Rethel, formerly the Duchy of Mazarin, a commune in France
Mazarin River, a river in Canada
Mazarin (album), a 2003 pop music album

See also
"The Adventure of the Mazarin Stone", one of 12 Sherlock Holmes short stories by Arthur Conan Doyle in The Case-Book of Sherlock Holmes
Bureau Mazarin, a 17th-century desk form named in memory of Cardinal Mazarin